German submarine U-367 was a Type VIIC U-boat of Nazi Germany's Kriegsmarine during World War II. She carried out no patrols. She did not sink or damage any ships. She was sunk by a Soviet mine northeast of Danzig (now Gdansk) on 15 March 1945.

Design
German Type VIIC submarines were preceded by the shorter Type VIIB submarines. U-367 had a displacement of  when at the surface and  while submerged. She had two shafts and two  propellers.

U-367 was fitted with five  torpedo tubes (four fitted at the bow and one at the stern), fourteen torpedoes, one  SK C/35 naval gun, 220 rounds, and two twin  C/30 anti-aircraft guns. The boat had a complement of between forty-four and sixty.

Service history
The submarine was laid down on 6 July 1942 at the Flensburger Schiffbau-Gesellschaft yard at Flensburg as yard number 490, launched on 11 June 1943 and commissioned on 27 August under the command of Oberleutnant zur See Ulrich Hammer. She served with the 23rd U-boat Flotilla from 27 August 1943 and the 31st flotilla from 20 February 1945.

Loss
U-367 sank after striking a mine on 16 March 1945 which had been laid by the  three days previously. Forty-three men died in the U-boat; there were no survivors.

References

Bibliography

External links

German Type VIIC submarines
U-boats commissioned in 1943
U-boats sunk in 1945
U-boats sunk by mines
1943 ships
Ships built in Flensburg
Ships lost with all hands
World War II submarines of Germany
U-boats sunk by Soviet submarines
Maritime incidents in March 1945